is a former professional Japanese tennis player. He started playing tennis at the age of four and turned professional in April 2003. He has won 18 singles titles on the ATP Challenger Tour, and achieved a career-high singles ranking of world No. 47 on 23 July 2012.

Career

Junior career
As a junior, he compiled a 49–48 win–loss record in singles (and 47–47 in doubles), achieving a singles ranking of No. 20 in December 2002 and doubles ranking of No. 43 in September 2002.

2002–04
Soeda began playing professional tournaments regularly in 2002 before turning professional in 2003. He played primarily on Asian ITF Futures event. Soeda rose steadily through his ATP ranking over the next three years. He ended 2004 as ranked world No. 493.

2005–07
In 2005, Soeda won two Futures tournament in Japan and Sri Lanka, and he made his debut in an ATP World Tour event in Ho Chi Minh City, losing to top seed Mariano Puerta in the first round. The following year, Soeda had a very steady year at the Challenger level, reaching the quarterfinals or better seven times, including his first Challenger final in Aptos. He also won the Japan F4 Futures. Soeda entered the world's top 200 in August and finished 2006 ranked No. 182.

Go made his first Grand Slam main-draw appearance at the 2007 Australian Open in January and lost to ninth seed Mario Ančić in the first round. In August 2007, Soeda defeated Eduardo Schwank to win his first Challenger title in Manta, and he reached the Brisbane Challenger final in November.

2008–10
In 2008, Soeda won four Challenger titles at Kyoto, Busan, New Delhi, and Toyota. He also won the most singles title in the ATP Challenger Series (tied with three players). In September, he beat wildcard Bai Yan in the China Open first round to record his first ATP main-draw win. He lost to third seed Fernando González in three sets. In October 2009, Soeda earned his sixth Challenger title in Tiburon by beating Ilija Bozoljac in the final.

In 2010, Soeda won his second Manta Challenger title in April. In the grass-court swing, he advanced to the Nottingham Challenger final before losing to Ričardas Berankis. He participated in the Wimbledon Championships main draw as a lucky loser, but he fell in the first round to Martin Fischer. Two weeks later, he reached the second round in Newport, beating eighth seed Taylor Dent in three sets.

2011: Reaching the top 100
Soeda reached the second round of the SA Tennis Open, beating seventh seed Rainer Schüttler. In March, he claimed his eighth Challenger title in Pingguo by beating Matthias Bachinger in the final. This result launched him into the world top 100 for the first time in his career, climbing to No. 91. Soeda took part in the French Open, losing to 12th seed Mikhail Youzhny in the first round. At the Wimbledon Championships, he received entry from a lucky loser spot, but lost to eventual semifinalist Jo-Wilfried Tsonga.

After winning the Wuhai Challenger title, Soeda qualified for the US Open, losing to Kevin Anderson in the first round. In the Asian swing, Soeda reached his first quarterfinal of an ATP World Tour event at the Thailand Open, beating Karol Beck and Tobias Kamke. His run was ended by Donald Young in straight sets. The following week, he received a wildcard and faced world No. 2, Rafael Nadal, in the Japan Open first round, losing in straight sets.

2012: Reaching the top 50
2012 started for Soeda at the Chennai Open, coming through qualifying. He beat Frederico Gil and fifth seed Ivan Dodig respectively to reach the quarterfinals, and he upset defending champion Stan Wawrinka in straight sets. His first semifinal in an ATP event came to an end, losing to top seed Janko Tipsarević in straight sets. Following the tournament, Soeda moved up in rankings to world No. 99 and back into the top 100 for the first time since April 2011. He won three Challenger titles from January to April, at Honolulu, Pingguo, and Kaohsiung. In the French Open, Soeda was eliminated in first round by Dmitry Tursunov.

In the grass-court season, Soeda reached the second round in the Queen's Club championships. Then he was into the Wimbledon Championships and advanced to the second round of a Grand Slam for the first time, beating Igor Kunitsyn in straight sets. He was beaten by ninth seed Juan Martín del Potro in four sets. In July, Soeda reached the semifinals of the Atlanta Open, knocking out Xavier Malisse and Igor Kunitsyn on the way. Then he faced his country's No. 1, Kei Nishikori, and upset him soundly. This was the first pairing of two players from Japan in an ATP quarterfinal since the Open era began. He eventually lost to Gilles Müller in straight sets. Soeda broke him into world's top 50 for the first time in his career, ranked No. 47 after the tournament.

Soeda represented Japan at his maiden Olympics in London 2012. He competed in singles and doubles, partnering Nishikori. In singles, he fell in the first round to Marcos Baghdatis of Cyprus, and lost to defending champions Swiss pairing of Roger Federer and Stan Wawrinka in the first round of doubles. In the US Open, Soeda lost in first round to 23rd seed Mardy Fish with two tiebreakers. In the later season, he reached the second round of the Thailand Open and the Stockholm Open.

2013
Soeda began the 2013 season in Chennai, reaching the quarterfinals for the second straight year. He defeated Evgeny Donskoy and Prakash Amritraj in the first two rounds, but he lost to eventual champion Janko Tipsarević. He then participated in the Australian Open and won over wildcard Luke Saville in the first round, before losing to world No. 8, Jo-Wilfried Tsonga. Following this event, Soeda successfully defended his title in the Maui Challenger, defeating Mischa Zverev in the final, and he reached the second round in Delray Beach by beating Marinko Matosevic in three sets.

Soeda bounced back from a first-round loss in the French Open by qualifying for the Wimbledon Championships without losing a set, and he beat Andreas Haider-Maurer to reach the second round for two consecutive years in this event. He was then defeated by world No. 9 Richard Gasquet in four sets. He managed to qualify for the US Open, but fell in the first round to Marcos Baghdatis. In the Asian swing, Soeda reached the second round in the Thailand Open, beating fellow qualifier Santiago Giraldo.

2014
Soeda faced world No. 4 and the previous year's finalist, Andy Murray, in the Australian Open first round, losing in straight sets. In September, he advanced to the second round in the Malaysian Open, before losing to Marinko Matosevic. Soeda recorded nine semifinal or better results at Challenger events in the year. These included winning the title in Busan, Nanchang, and Toyota. He ended 2014 ranked within the top 100 for the second time in his career.

2015
Soeda started 2015 season by playing in Australia and won through the opening round of the Australian Open, beating qualifier Elias Ymer. He was beaten by 31st seed Fernando Verdasco in the second round. In Houston, Soeda defeated former world No. 1 Lleyton Hewitt in the first round. After winning another Challenger title in Seoul, he was into the main draw at the French Open and Wimbledon Championships, but he faced seeded players in the first round, losing to Philipp Kohlschreiber and John Isner. During the American hard-court season, Soeda made it into the quarterfinals in Atlanta, knocking out Alexandr Dolgopolov and fourth seed Adrian Mannarino on the way, but was beaten by Gilles Müller.

2022: Retirement
He retired on 31 October 2022 having played his last match at the Japan National Championships.

Davis Cup
Soeda made his Davis Cup debut for Japan in 2005, Asia/Oceania Zone Group I relegation play-offs against Thailand. He played in the singles rubber and beat Sanchai Ratiwatana in straight sets. To date, Soeda has compiled a 26–12 win–loss record overall (24–10 in singles and 2–2 in doubles). He received the Davis Cup Commitment Award in April 2014.

In the first round of 2012 Davis Cup World Group against Croatia, Soeda faced Ivan Dodig in the first singles rubber and defeated him in a 4 hour, 5 minute match. This victory was Japan’s first win in a World Group match (In their previous two World Group matches, Japan lost 0–5). He was beaten by Ivo Karlovic in reverse singles, and Japan lost 2–3. He scored another notable win in the 2013 Davis Cup World Group Play-offs against Colombia. He lost to Santiago Giraldo in five sets, but defeated Alejandro Falla in the deciding rubber to put Japan back in the World Group for 2014.

Playing style
Soeda is an offensive counterpuncher. Due to his relatively small size (5'10"), Soeda lacks the power and stature to effectively dictate points. Instead, he relies on quickness to retrieve opponent's shots, as well as a relatively flat, penetrating two-handed backhand. As noted by commentator Nick Lester in the BB&T Atlanta Open, Soeda plays a conventional style of tennis, approaching and finishing points at the net when possible.

Davis Cup 

   indicates the outcome of the Davis Cup match followed by the score, date, place of event, the zonal classification and its phase, and the court surface.

Challenger and Futures finals

Singles 42 (24–18)

Doubles 14 (2–12)

Performance timelines

Singles
Current through the 2022 Cincinnati Masters.

1 Held as Hamburg Masters (clay) until 2008, Madrid Masters (clay) 2009–present.

2 Held as Madrid Masters (indoor hardcourt) from 2002 to 2008, Shanghai Masters (outdoor hardcourt) 2009–present.

Doubles
Current through the 2022 US Open

Record against other players

Record against top 10 players 
Kwon's record against players who have been ranked in the top 10, with those who are active in boldface. Only ATP Tour main draw, Davis Cup and Olympic matches are considered:

Record against players ranked No. 11–20
Active players are in boldface. 

  Andrei Pavel 0–1
 Sam Querrey 0–2
  Igor Andreev 0–1
  Dmitry Tursunov 0–1
 Ivo Karlović 0–1
 Philipp Kohlschreiber 0–2
 Xavier Malisse 1–1
 Feliciano López 0–1
 Viktor Troicki 0–1
 Alexandr Dolgopolov 1–0
*

References

External links

 
 
 
 
 Soeda World Ranking history

Japanese male tennis players
People from Fujisawa, Kanagawa
Sportspeople from Kanagawa Prefecture
1984 births
Living people
Asian Games medalists in tennis
Tennis players at the 2012 Summer Olympics
Olympic tennis players of Japan
Tennis players at the 2006 Asian Games
Tennis players at the 2010 Asian Games
Asian Games silver medalists for Japan
Asian Games bronze medalists for Japan
Medalists at the 2006 Asian Games
Medalists at the 2010 Asian Games